This article provides details of international football games played by the Morocco national football team from 2020 onwards.

Results

2020

2021

2022

2023

Head to head records

Notes

References

Football in Morocco
Results
2020s in Moroccan sport